The Real Deal: Greatest Hits, Volume 2 is a compilation album of material by Stevie Ray Vaughan in 1999 (see 1999 in music). The album was released by Epic Records and includes material from the five studio albums he released with Double Trouble as well as live material and collaborations with brother Jimmie and surf guitarist Dick Dale.

Track listing
"Love Struck Baby" (Vaughan) – 2:22
 from Texas Flood
"Ain't Gone 'N' Give Up on Love" (Vaughan) – 6:06
 from Soul to Soul
"Scuttle Buttin'" (Vaughan) – 1:51
 from Couldn't Stand the Weather
"Wall of Denial" (Doyle Bramhall, Vaughan) – 5:36
 from In Step
"Lenny" (Vaughan) – 4:57
 from Texas Flood
"Superstition" (live) (Stevie Wonder) – 4:41
 from Live Alive
"Empty Arms" (Vaughan) – 3:29
 from The Sky Is Crying
"Riviera Paradise" (Vaughan) – 8:50
 from In Step
"Look At Little Sister" (Hank Ballard) – 3:08
 from Soul to Soul
"Willie the Wimp" (live) (Bill Carter, Ruth Ellsworth) – 4:35
 from Live Alive
"Pipeline" (Brian Carman, Bob Spickard) – 3:01
 with Dick Dale, from Back to the Beach Soundtrack
"Shake for Me" (live) (Willie Dixon) – 3:51
 from In the Beginning
"Leave My Girl Alone" (Live at Austin City Limits, 10/10/89) (Buddy Guy) – 4:47
 first commercial release; studio version from In Step
"Telephone Song" (Bramhall, Vaughan) – 3:28
 with Jimmie Vaughan, from Family Style
"Voodoo Child (Slight Return)" (Jimi Hendrix) – 8:00
 from Couldn't Stand the Weather
"Life By the Drop" (Bramhall, Barbara Logan) – 2:27
 from The Sky Is Crying

Personnel
A complete list of personnel can be found on each previous release.

Production for compilation
Bob Irwin – producer
Vic Anesini – mastering
Scott Jordan – liner notes
Robert Matheu – photography

References

Stevie Ray Vaughan albums
1999 greatest hits albums
Epic Records compilation albums